SSPE may refer to:
 Subacute sclerosing panencephalitis - A rare disease of the brain caused by measles infection.
 Securitisation Special Purpose Entity - A common type of special purpose entity used to securitise loans or other receivables.